Chris Alan Coles (born c. 1968) is an American former college basketball coach. Coles is the son of the late Charlie Coles, former men's basketball head coach at Miami University and Central Michigan University.

References

1960s births
Living people
African-American basketball coaches
African-American basketball players
Central Michigan Chippewas men's basketball players
College men's basketball head coaches in the United States
High school basketball coaches in the United States
Olivet Comets men's basketball coaches
Saginaw Valley State Cardinals men's basketball coaches
American men's basketball players
21st-century African-American people
20th-century African-American sportspeople